Peter van Buren (born 1960) is a former United States Foreign Service employee, and the author of two novels and two non-fiction books about military affairs.

Early life
Peter van Buren was born in New York City.

Career
Van Buren served in the U.S. Department of State for 24 years, including a year in Iraq as a team leader for two Provincial Reconstruction Teams (PRTs).

After his book, We Meant Well: How I Helped Lose the Battle for the Hearts and Minds of the Iraqi People, was published in 2012 Van Buren claims to have experienced a series of escalating, adverse actions. According to his former employer, the U. S. State Department, van Buren had not properly cleared his book for publication under Department rules, and the book contained unauthorized disclosures of classified material. The Washington Post noted that "Van Buren has tested the First Amendment almost daily." The Government Accountability Project and the ACLU helped defend van Buren, and the State Department eventually allowed him to retire with his standard pension and benefits.

Van Buren was associate producer for the film Silenced (2014) by James Spione.

In August 2018, Twitter banned Van Buren for life for writing that "harasses, intimidates, or uses fear to silence someone else's voice."

Bibliography

References

External links
Website (wemeantwell.com)
Twitter account (@wemeantwell) - account suspended August 2018

Living people
1960 births
American diplomats
American political writers
American male non-fiction writers